Hojjatabad (also Romanized as Ḩojjatābād) is a village in Miyan Jovin Rural District, Helali District, Joghatai County, Razavi Khorasan Province, Iran. At the 2006 census, its population was 600, in 126 families.

References 

Populated places in Joghatai County